"2 of Amerikaz Most Wanted" is a song by American rapper 2Pac from his fourth studio album, All Eyez on Me (1996). The song features fellow West Coast rapper Snoop Doggy Dogg and was produced by Daz Dillinger. The song was released as a promotional single for the album on May 7, 1996 and later as the B-side to the album's second major and third overall single, How Do U Want It. The song peaked at number 46 on the US Billboard Hot R&B/Hip-Hop Airplay chart. The song contains interpolations of  Grandmaster Flash and The Furious Five's song "The Message" and "Radio Activity Rap (Let's Jam)" by MC Frosty and Lovin' C.

Although the song was limited to a promo release, a music video was filmed for it. The version of the song used for the music video differs from the version on the album, with clean alternative lyrics, delay on the word "Party" within the chorus, and an arpeggio added to the beat.

Music video

The music video was directed by one of Shakur's production partners, Tracy Robinson. The prelude for the song shows a parody of Biggie Smalls ("Piggy") and Puff Daddy  in discussion with Shakur about the November 1994 shooting. The beginning of the scene where Tupac is speaking to Biggie is in reference to the movie Scarface, where Tony Montana speaks to his alleged killer before shooting him. The music video was released on April 28, 1996.

Live performances 

The song was the last one performed in their House of Blues concert on July 4, 1996, Shakur's last recorded performance. The performance was featured on the 2005 Live at the House of Blues live album.

This song was performed by Dr. Dre and Snoop Dogg as a tribute to Shakur during the 2000 Up In Smoke Tour. The performance included a sample of Shakur's verse.

On April 15, 2012, the song was performed at the Coachella Festival with Snoop Dogg rapping with a hologram of Shakur.

Appearances

The song was included on numerous 2Pac compilations, including his Greatest Hits and Best of: Thug album.

The song was featured in the first episode of the TV series Gang Related.

The song was played on Shakur's biopic, All Eyez On Me (2017) with 2Pac and Snoop in the studio recording the song.

Personnel
Engineer: Dave Aron
Engineer: Rick Clifford
Assistant engineer: Alvin McGill
Mixing: David Blake
Featuring (Rap): Snoop Doggy Dogg

Charts

References

1996 songs
1996 singles
Tupac Shakur songs
Snoop Dogg songs
Songs written by Snoop Dogg
Songs written by Tupac Shakur
Gangsta rap songs
Interscope Records singles
Songs written by Daz Dillinger